Arvydas Čepulis is a Lithuanian basketball player.

Honours
LKL Three-point Shootout champion (2017)

References

1979 births
Living people
Lithuanian men's basketball players
Astoria Bydgoszcz players
Small forwards